The 1942 All Ireland Camogie Championship was won by Dublin, beating Cork in a replayed final. Cork thought they had won the initial final at the Mardyke when Renee Fitzgerald scored first an equalising, then a late winning goal. Referee Sean Gleeson said he had blown the whistle before Fitzgerald's second goal. The replay was the first All Ireland final to have a match programme and the first to be broadcast by Radio Éireann.

Final stages
In the All Ireland semi-finals Cork beat Galway 7–4 to 2–0 and Dublin beat Antrim 12–0 to 1–0. Cork had a goal disallowed in the last minute of the drawn final.

Final stages

 Match Rules
50 minutes
Replay if scores level
Maximum of 3 substitutions allowable only if player was injured

See also
 All-Ireland Senior Hurling Championship
 Wikipedia List of Camogie players
 National Camogie League
 Camogie All Stars Awards
 Ashbourne Cup

References

External links
 Camogie Association
 History of Camogie senior championship slideshow. presented by Cumann Camógaíochta Communications Committee at GAA Museum January 25, 2010 part one, part two, part three and part four
 Historic newspaper reports of All Ireland finals
 Camogie on official GAA website
 Timeline: History of Camogie
 Camogie on GAA Oral History Project
 Camogie Websites for Antrim and Dublin

1942 in camogie
1942